Johannes Brink (29 April 1912 – 29 April 1976) was a Dutch swimmer. He competed in the men's 4 × 200 metre freestyle relay event at the 1928 Summer Olympics.

References

External links
 

1912 births
1976 deaths
Dutch male freestyle swimmers
Olympic swimmers of the Netherlands
Swimmers at the 1928 Summer Olympics
Swimmers from Amsterdam